Joseph Dickson is a U.S. politician.

Joseph Dickson may also refer to:
Joe Dickson (born 1940), Canadian politician
Joe Dickson (footballer) (1934–1990), English footballer
Joseph Dickson (sport shooter), member of the winning 1985 ISSF Olympic skeet men team
Joseph Z. Dickson, co-founder of Dickson Prize

See also
Joseph Dixon (disambiguation)